The Bismarck North Dakota Temple is the 61st operating temple of the Church of Jesus Christ of Latter-day Saints (LDS Church).

Missionary work in North Dakota began in 1914 and by 1930, there were 145 members in the state, and by 1997, those numbers had climbed to 5,000.

Ground was broken for the temple on October 17, 1998, despite inclement weather. The Bismarck North Dakota Temple district covers about 200,000 square miles (5.0E+5 km2) and serves about 9,000 members. The exterior is finished with granite veneer from Quebec. A gold-plated statue of the Angel Moroni tops the single-spire.

LDS Church president Gordon B. Hinckley dedicated the temple in North Dakota, the only state he had not previously visited, on September 19, 1999.

The Bismarck North Dakota Temple has a total of 10,700 square feet (990 m2), two ordinance rooms, and two sealing rooms.

In 2020, like all the church's other temples, the Bismarck North Dakota Temple was closed in response to the coronavirus pandemic.

See also

Russell T. Osguthorpe, temple president (2014–)
Comparison of temples of The Church of Jesus Christ of Latter-day Saints
List of temples of The Church of Jesus Christ of Latter-day Saints
List of temples of The Church of Jesus Christ of Latter-day Saints by geographic region
Temple architecture (Latter-day Saints)
The Church of Jesus Christ of Latter-day Saints in North Dakota

References

Additional reading

External links

Bismarck North Dakota Temple Official site
Bismarck North Dakota Temple at ChurchofJesusChristTemples.org

20th-century Latter Day Saint temples
Buildings and structures in Bismarck, North Dakota
Latter Day Saint movement in North Dakota
Religious buildings and structures in North Dakota
Temples (LDS Church) completed in 1999
Temples (LDS Church) in the United States
1999 establishments in North Dakota
Religious organizations based in North Dakota